Huang Lü (fl. 1769–1829), was a Chinese scientist. She was the first woman in China to work with optics and photographic images.

Huang Lü was the daughter of the education officer Huang Chao, who encouraged her to educate herself. She studied science such as astronomy and arithmetic.
She became acquainted with Zheng Fuguang, who had studied the Western optics which had at that time been introduced in China. She constructed a type of telescope and a prototype of a camera, as well as a type of thermometer. 

Chen Wenshu (1775–1845) described her as "an extremely talented woman in every aspect of art and technology" in his poem "Tianjing ge yong Huang Yingqin".

See also 
Timeline of women in science

References 

1829 deaths
18th-century Chinese people
19th-century Chinese people
19th-century Chinese women
19th-century women scientists
19th-century Chinese scientists
18th-century Chinese scientists
18th-century Chinese women